Guillermo Alejandro Pallomari González (born October 1, 1949), nicknamed Reagan, is a Chilean accountant who worked for the Cali Cartel and participated in a scandal involving financial fraud during the 1994 Colombian presidential election that bestowed Ernesto Samper (now former president) as winner of the respective elections. Pallomari is currently under the Witness Protection Program of the United States.

Biography 
Pallomari was born on October 1, 1949, in María Elena, Antofagasta Region, Chile, to Lilian González and Guillermo Pallomari Astudillo.

Pallomari obtained a degree in accounting, although he never formally worked in that sector. He also obtained a degree in systems engineering a few years later.

In 1973, during the military dictatorship of Chile (1973–1990), Pallomari moved with scarce economic resources, to Colombia. During those years, he obtained a work as bank supervisor and later on, in a textile company.

He married Gladys Patricia Cárdona, and along with her, founded a technological company called Universal Link. They had two children.

In 1990, he began working for the Rodriguez-Orejuela brothers, as chief accountant to manage their illicit drug trade.

Pallomari was captured by the Search Bloc, on June 8, 1994, while staying in his office, in Cali. After collaborating with information concerning Ernesto Samper's electoral fraud (in which he received more than USD $6 million to finance his campaign expenses; equivalent to $10.5 million in 2020) and Cali's illicit operations, he moved to the United States to testify and is under the Witness Protection Program.

In the popular culture 
 In TV Series En la boca del lobo is portrayed by the colombian actor Cristobal Errázuriz as the character of Guillermo Palomino.
 Pallomari was featured in the third season of Narcos, where he was portrayed by Spanish actor Javier Cámara.

See also 
 Proceso 8000

References 

Cali Cartel traffickers
1949 births
Living people
People from Antofagasta